Edward S. Spotovich (May 6, 1916 – September 7, 2002) was an American professional basketball player. He played college basketball and football for the University of Pittsburgh. In football, the 1937 team went undefeated and were named national champions in the AP Poll. Spotovich then played in the National Basketball League for the Pittsburgh Pirates during the 1938–39 season and averaged 4.3 points per game in three games played.

Spotovich then played semi-professional basketball in Connecticut and Massachusetts. He served in World War II, then worked as a schoolteacher for 42 years at Connellsville High School.

References

1916 births
2002 deaths
American men's basketball players
United States Coast Guard personnel of World War II
Basketball players from Pittsburgh
Centers (basketball)
Forwards (basketball)
High school basketball coaches in the United States
Pittsburgh Panthers football players
Pittsburgh Panthers men's basketball players
Pittsburgh Pirates (NBL) players
Players of American football from Pittsburgh